Sutnga Saipung is one of the 60 Legislative Assembly constituencies of Meghalaya state in India. It is part of East Jaintia Hills district and is reserved for candidates belonging to the Scheduled Tribes. It falls under Shillong Lok Sabha constituency and its current MLA is Shitlang Pale of Indian National Congress.

Members of Legislative Assembly
The list of MLAs are given below

Sutnga

|-style="background:#E9E9E9;"
!Year
!colspan="2" align="center"|Party
!align="center" |MLA
!Votes
|-
|1972
|bgcolor="#DDDDDD"|
|align="left"| Independent
|align="left"| Onwardleys Well Nongtfd
|2411 
|}

Sutnga Saipung

|-style="background:#E9E9E9;"
!Year
!colspan="2" align="center"|Party
!align="center" |MLA
!Votes
|-
|1978
|bgcolor="#0000B3"|
|align="left"| Hill State People's Democratic Party
|align="left"| Barrister Pakem
|2675 
|-
|1983
|bgcolor="#0000B3"|
|align="left"| Hill State People's Democratic Party
|align="left"| Barrister Pakem
|3548  
|-
|1988
|bgcolor="#00FFFF"|
|align="left"| Indian National Congress
|align="left"| Onwardleys Well Nongtfd
|5536 
|-
|1993
|bgcolor="#CEF2E0"|
|align="left"| Hill People's Union
|align="left"| Oliverneat Chyrmang 
|7218  
|-
|1998 
|bgcolor="#CEF2E0"|
|align="left"| United Democratic Party
|align="left"| Oliverneat Chyrmang 
|7282
|-
|2003
|bgcolor="#00FFFF"|
|align="left"| Indian National Congress
|align="left"| Shitlang Pale
|8182
|-
|2008
|bgcolor="#00FFFF"|
|align="left"| Indian National Congress
|align="left"| Shitlang Pale
|9814  
|}

Sutnga Saipung

|-style="background:#E9E9E9;"
!Year
!colspan="2" align="center"|Party
!align="center" |MLA
!Votes
|-
|2013
|bgcolor="#DDDDDD"|
|align="left"| Independent
|align="left"| Hopeful Bamon
|14205
|-
|2018
|bgcolor="#00FFFF"|
|align="left"| Indian National Congress
|align="left"| Shitlang Pale
|12257 
|}

Election results

2018

See also
List of constituencies of the Meghalaya Legislative Assembly
East Jaintia Hills district
Shillong (Lok Sabha constituency)

References

Assembly constituencies of Meghalaya
East Jaintia Hills district